Charteris Bay, officially Te Wharau / Charteris Bay, is a large inlet on the southern coast of Lyttelton Harbour / Whakaraupō, New Zealand. It abuts Diamond Harbour to the east and Teddington to the west. The boundary of the bay also includes Ōtamahua / Quail Island.

The community is notable for Orton Bradley Park and as the location of a quarry which produced a decorative sandstone used in many early buildings of Christchurch.

The community is spread out along the main road from Teddington to Diamond Harbour. It has a golf course adjacent to Orton Bradley park and a popular sailing club, which advertises itself as "home of the Optimist" – a reference to the Optimist sailing dinghy first sailed in New Zealand from Charteris Bay.

At low tide some extensive mud flats support a wide range of wading birds including Royal spoonbills.

Demographics
The Charteris Bay settlement is part of the Diamond Harbour SA2 statistical area.

It  had a population of 147 at the 2018 New Zealand census, an increase of 9 people (6.5%) since the 2013 census, and an increase of 9 people (6.5%) since the 2006 census. There were 72 households. There were 66 males and 78 females, giving a sex ratio of 0.85 males per female. The median age was 55.4 years (compared with 37.4 years nationally), with 15 people (10.2%) aged under 15 years, 12 (8.2%) aged 15 to 29, 75 (51.0%) aged 30 to 64, and 42 (28.6%) aged 65 or older.

Ethnicities were 98.0% European/Pākehā, 8.2% Māori, and 2.0% Pacific peoples (totals add to more than 100% since people could identify with multiple ethnicities).

Although some people objected to giving their religion, 61.2% had no religion, 30.6% were Christian and 2.0% had other religions.

Of those at least 15 years old, 54 (40.9%) people had a bachelor or higher degree, and 9 (6.8%) people had no formal qualifications. The median income was $48,600, compared with $31,800 nationally. The employment status of those at least 15 was that 66 (50.0%) people were employed full-time, 24 (18.2%) were part-time, and 0 (0.0%) were unemployed.

References

Banks Peninsula
Populated places in Canterbury, New Zealand